Neil Mathur may refer to:
 Neil D. Mathur, professor in materials physics at the University of Cambridge
 Neil Nitin Mukesh (born 1982 as Neil Nitin Mukesh Chand Mathur), Indian actor